El Altar or Capac Urcu (possibly from Kichwa kapak principal, great, important / magnificence, urku mountain) is an extinct volcano on the western side of Sangay National Park in Ecuador,  south of Quito, with a highest point of . Spaniards named it so because it resembled two nuns and four friars listening to a bishop around a church altar. In older English sources it is also called The Altar.

Geology
El Altar consists of a large stratovolcano of Pliocene-Pleistocene age with a caldera breached to the west. Inca legends report that the top of El Altar collapsed after seven years of activity in about 1460, but the caldera is considered to be much older than this by geologists.

Access and recreation
El Altar is perhaps the most technically demanding climb in Ecuador. The route to the El Obispo summit is graded D+. December through February are the best months to attempt an ascent. Much more accessible is the hike to the lake within the caldera of the mountain. From Riobamba, one takes a bus for about an hour to Candelaria and then checks in at the ranger station to enter the Sangay park. About 4–7 hours of an extremely muddy trail (knee-high rubber boots are recommended) leaves one at the refuge belonging to Hacienda Releche, which can be rented. The refuge has many beds, and a kitchen. To hike to the lake is another 1.5h - 2 hours from the refuge across a valley and up a steep hill.

List of peaks
The nine peaks of El Altar, starting with the highest summit on the south side and proceeding counterclockwise:

See also

Geography of Ecuador
List of mountains in Ecuador
List of Ultras of South America
Lists of volcanoes
List of volcanoes in Ecuador

References

Sources
 
  (in Spanish)

External links
 Altar: Etymology
 "Volcán Altar, Ecuador" on Peakbagger

Stratovolcanoes of Ecuador
Calderas of Ecuador
Volcanic crater lakes
Extinct volcanoes
Five-thousanders of the Andes